"Strangers" is a song by American singer Halsey featuring Lauren Jauregui. It was released on May 26, 2017 through Astralwerks as the second promotional single from her second studio album, Hopeless Fountain Kingdom (2017). The song received critical acclaim. Halsey later released a music video on June 20, 2018.

Background
The album's track listing was revealed on April 29, 2017 on Halsey's Instagram account, where it was first known that Halsey would collaborate with Fifth Harmony's Lauren Jauregui on a song called "Strangers". In April, during several radio interviews that Halsey attended to promote the album, she further commented about the song:
I was thinking to myself, if I want this song to be believable, it needs to be real, so I'm not going to put a girl on the song to sing who's straight. I'm just not going to do it. So I reached out to Lauren and she came in and she cut the vocal and it sounds awesome. Our voices sound really cool together because we both have really raspy voices, mine's a little more delicate than hers. Hers is like really powerful and big and raspy, and mine is kind of like light and raspy. But it's really cool because I'm bisexual. I just love that Lauren and I are two women who have a mainstream pop presence doing a love song for the LGBT community, it's unheard of. It's very rare to see it from a female perspective.

Composition

"Strangers" incorporates a 1980s-inspired production, with echoed synthesizers and strong drumline
Analyzing its lyrical content Alexia Shouneya from Billboard wrote, "Strangers is about two women longing for one another," while Christina Lee of Idolator opined, "The lyrics actually tell a straightforward story about a dissolved relationship, and the loneliness that quickly follows."

Critical reception

"Strangers" received critical acclaim. AllMusic's journalist Stephen Thomas Erlewine noted that "same-sex love songs remain a rarity in the pop music of the 2010s, and ... that's a sly reveal of how Halsey represents a generational shift". In her review for Billboard, Alexia Shouneya noted "in the first verse alone, she uses the female pronoun four times, once in every line, making it impossible to miss, skim over or interpret as anything other than what it was meant to be: a strong, unapologetic acknowledgement of lesbian and bisexual women." Anna Caga of Spin believed that "Strangers" is the "best Halsey['s] song" and described it as "slinky and addicting", adding that its best moments are "Jauregui's ad-libs, the way she slurs the word 'innocent' with the kind of spontaneous passion Halsey never allows herself." In Pitchfork, Katherine St. Asaph said the song "shimmers and yearns like a recent Tegan and Sara cut" and "contains the album's most nuanced lyrics, the coupling that's most promising yet most out of reach."

Billboard ranked "Strangers" at number 97 on its critics list of the 100 Best Songs of 2017. Chris Payne wrote that it is Billboard staff's favorite song from the album, praising Halsey and Jauregui's chemistry and Jauregui's tone and delivery of "lovesick desperation". Billboard regarded the song as a "long-overdue bisexual milestone in mainstream music." In 2019, Billboard included the song in its list of the "30 Lesbian Love Songs".

Live performances
Halsey and Jauregui performed "Strangers" on Today on June 9, 2017. The following day, the two performed the song at iHeartSummer '17 Weekend in Miami Beach, Florida. In June 2018, they performed the song on Good Morning America.

Credits and personnel
Credits adapted from the liner notes of Hopeless Fountain Kingdom.

 Halsey – vocals
 Julian Burg – recording
 Chris Gehringer – mastering
 Serban Ghenea – mixing
 John Hanes – engineering for mix
 Lauren Jauregui – vocals
 Ezra Kurstin – voices
 Greg Kurstin – drum programming, drums, guitar, keyboards, production, recording
 Alex Pasco – recording

Charts

Certifications

References

External links
 

2017 songs
Halsey (singer) songs
Lauren Jauregui songs
Bisexuality-related songs
Song recordings produced by Greg Kurstin
Songs written by Greg Kurstin
Female vocal duets
Songs written by Halsey (singer)